The Principles for Digital Development are a set of nine guidelines for integrating best practices into technology-enabled development programs for international development and cooperation.

History 
The seed for the Digital Principles began in 2009 when UNICEF launched their Principles for Innovation and Technology Development. A year later, meetings amongst 40 mhealth donors produced the Greentree Principles. A "Principles for Digital Development Working Group" was launched in 2014. The group met nine times throughout the year during which over 500 individuals representing more than 100 organizations took part. Following the Working Group meetings an endorsement campaign began in 2016, led by USAID, and 54 organizations endorsed the new Principles for Digital Development. In 2016, the United Nations Foundation's Digital Impact Alliance became steward of the Principles for Digital Development to help facilitate their adoption.

Principles 

 Design with User
 Understand the Existing Ecosystem
 Design for Scale
 Build for Sustainability
 Be Data Driven
 Use Open Standards, Open Source and Open Innovation
 Reuse and Improve
 Address Privacy & Security
 Be Collaborative

Endorsers
The Principles for Digital Development are endorsed by over 200 organisations,

References

External links 
Principles for Digital Development Homepage
Digital Impact Alliance Homepage

International development